The 1929–30 NCAA men's basketball season began in December 1929, progressed through the regular season and conference tournaments, and concluded in March 1930.

Rules changes 

 The practice of enclosing basketball courts in chicken wire, chain-link fencing, or rope — giving basketball the nickname "the cage game" — ended. Intended to increase the tempo of play by keeping the ball from going out of bounds, to protect players and rowdy spectators from each another, and to prevent fans from throwing objects onto the court, the use of these "cages" had led to rough physical play in which players body-checked each other into the barrier, resulting in injuries. The slang term "cager" for a basketball player derives from the use of these "cages."
 The number of referees increased from one to two.

Season headlines 

Pittsburgh defeated Montana State 37–36 in what was billed as a national championship game.
 In February 1943, the Helms Athletic Foundation retroactively selected Pittsburgh as its national champion for the 1929–30 season.
 In 1995, the Premo-Porretta Power Poll retroactively selected Alabama as its national champion for the 1929–30 season.

Regular season

Conference winners and tournaments

Statistical leaders

Awards

Consensus All-American team

Major player of the year awards 

 Helms Player of the Year: Chuck Hyatt, Pittsburgh (retroactive selection in 1944)

Coaching changes 

A number of teams changed coaches during the season and after it ended.

References